Parker Jackson-Cartwright (born July 12, 1995) is an American professional basketball player for Beşiktaş Emlakjet of the Basketbol Süper Ligi (BSL). He played college basketball for the Arizona Wildcats.

High school career
Jackson-Cartwright began his high school career at Loyola High School. He missed 12 games during his junior season due to a stress fracture. Jackson-Cartwright averaged 14 points, eight assists, five rebounds and two steals per game as a junior. Jackson-Cartwright missed his senior season of high school due to an academic issue. Rather than being dismissed from the team, he withdrew from the school in February 2014 and transferred to Sierra Canyon School, where he finished high school without basketball. He was a four-star recruit and committed to Arizona over UCLA, Washington, USC and others. The 2016 film At All Costs chronicles his AAU career and college recruitment.

College career
Jackson-Cartwright served as a backup to T. J. McConnell as a freshman, averaging 2.9 points and 1.8 assists per game. He split time with Kadeem Allen at point guard as a sophomore and averaged 5.2 points and 3.4 assists per game. Jackson-Cartwright averaged 5.9 points, 2.5 rebounds, and 4.1 assists per game as a junior, shooting 42.3 percent from behind the 3-point arc. In August 2017, he traveled with the team to Spain and was only feet away when the 2017 Barcelona attacks began, and ducked into a store until they ended. Coming into his senior season, he missed a practice and Pac-12 Media Day with a thigh contusion. On January 4, 2018, he scored a career-high 19 points in a 94-82 win over Utah. As a senior, Jackson-Cartwright averaged 7.8 points and 4.5 assists per game, shooting 41.7 percent from 3-point range. He finished his college career with 459 assists.

Professional career
After graduating from Arizona, Jackson-Cartwright was drafted by Raptors 905 of the NBA G League in the second round of the 2018 NBA G League draft with the 52nd pick. He was cut during training camp due to a leg injury. Jackson-Cartwright was acquired by the Westchester Knicks in February 2019 and participated in two games for the team.

On July 20, 2019, Jackson-Cartwright signed with the Cheshire Phoenix of the British Basketball League. During the shortened 2019-20 season, Jackson-Cartwright tied Cheshire’s single-game assist record with 13 in two games and scored over 20 points in five of the 13 games during the BBL Championship. He finished second in the league in points per game (20.2), third in assists (7.4) and first in steals (3.7). In June 2020, he was named BBL Player of the Year.

On July 17, 2020, Jackson-Cartwright signed with Saint-Quentin of the LNB Pro B. He received the 2021 LNB Pro B Most Valuable Player award after averaging 15.4 points, 3.2 rebounds, and 7.2 assists per game.

On July 5, 2021, he has signed with Telekom Baskets Bonn of the Basketball Bundesliga.

On July 8, 2022, he has signed with ASVEL of the French LNB Pro A  and the EuroLeague.

On January 18, 2023, he signed with Beşiktaş Emlakjet of the Basketbol Süper Ligi (BSL).

Personal life
Jackson-Cartwright is the son of Belinda and Ramon. His older brother Miles played college basketball at Penn and professionally.

References

External links
Arizona Wildcats bio

1995 births
Living people
Amateur Athletic Union men's basketball players
American expatriate basketball people in France
American expatriate basketball people in Germany
American expatriate basketball people in the United Kingdom
American men's basketball players
Arizona Wildcats men's basketball players
ASVEL Basket players
Basketball players from Los Angeles
Beşiktaş men's basketball players
Cheshire Phoenix players
Point guards
Saint-Quentin Basket-Ball players
Sierra Canyon School alumni
Telekom Baskets Bonn players
Westchester Knicks players